Valerie Miles  Sweet (1914–1999) was a Welsh artist and illustrator.

Biography
Miles was born at Aberkenfig in south Wales and studied at the Cardiff School of Art between 1932 and 1938. Miles obtained several commissions to illustrate children's books and also painted portraits of children and adults plus animal paintings, most notably of dogs. She was an active member of, and exhibitor with the Pekinese Society of Wales. Her landscape paintings were centred around her home at Gwaelod-y-Garth near Cardiff. Miles was a member of the South Wales Art Society and participated in a number of their group exhibitions, in exhibitions at the Oriel Cardiff and in Arts Council of Wales shows.

References

External links

1914 births
1999 deaths
20th-century Welsh women artists
Alumni of Cardiff School of Art and Design
People from Bridgend County Borough
Welsh women painters